Bernard Guasch (born 3 April 1960) is a French former rugby league player, who played as stand-off and the current CEO of the Super League and French Rugby League Championship team, the Catalans Dragons and has been since their formation in 2001.

Biography 

Guasch's father, José Guasch, is a Spanish republican refugee and became a rugby union player for USA Perpignan, notably disputing the final of the 1951-52 French Rugby Union Championship. Wanting to open a butchery, he asked a loan for USAP, however, the latter refused and XIII Catalan supported his initiative if he played rugby league, which was what he did.

He speaks Catalan fluently.

Playing career 
Guasch played as stand-off for XIII Catalan between 1977 and 1982 and for Saint-Estève XIII between 1982 and 1989. His brother, Bruno Guasch, played for XIII Catalan, and his son Joan Guasch played for Dragons Catalans and Saint-Estève XIII Catalan.

The Catalans Dragons project 
The rugby league dirigents requested Guasch for his "leadership skills". In 2000, two great French clubs, XIII Catalan and Saint-Estève, merge to form Union Treiziste Catalane, which dominated the French Rugby League Championship, later the club became Catalans Dragons before its integration in Super League, becoming in 2006 the only French elite team in the Northern Hemisphere. It was a sports success as the club arrived to the 2007 Challenge Cup final and qualified in the 2008 Super League play-offs, as well an economic success as the club culminated with more than 8.000 spectators at home, which convinced GL Events to invest into the club by taking shares and Nike became the kit supplier in 2009.

Creation of a moral agreement with USA Perpignan?
Since the late 2010s, it was attributed to him the wish to "create a moral agreement with USA Perpignan, done like on the other side of the Channel". However, the rugby union club did not seem to answer concretely to this will.

References 

Living people
1960 births
Catalans Dragons
French rugby league administrators
French people of Spanish descent
Rugby league chairmen and investors
Sports owners
Rugby league five-eighths